Absecon Inlet is a narrow strait on the southeastern coast of New Jersey in the United States.

Geography
Absecon Inlet leads from the Atlantic Ocean through barrier islands in Atlantic County, New Jersey.  Its southern shore is the north end of Absecon Island, on which lies Atlantic City, New Jersey. Absecon Lighthouse is south of the inlet and overlooks it from the north end of Absecon Island. Brigantine Island is to the north and east. The Brigantine Bridge carries New Jersey Route 87 over the inlet.

Absecon Inlet separates Absecon Island from Brigantine Island, and including its continuation, Absecon Channel, connects Absecon Bay and Reeds Bay with the Atlantic Ocean.

Absecon Inlet was described in 1878, viz.,

Namesakes
Two United States Navy ships—the cargo ship USS Absecon, in use briefly in 1918, and the aircraft catapult training ship USS Absecon, in commission from 1943 to 1947—and the United States Coast Guard cutter [[USCGC Absecon (WAVP-374)|USCGC Absecon]], in commission from 1949 to 1972, were named for Absecon Inlet.

Notes

ReferencesMerriam Webster's Geographical Dictionary, Third Edition''. Springfield, Massachusetts: Merriam-Webster, Incorporated, 1997. .
 (See ship namesake paragraph.)

Inlets of New Jersey
Straits of New Jersey
Bodies of water of Atlantic County, New Jersey